Inhibin, alpha, also known as INHA, is a protein which in humans is encoded by the INHA  gene.

Function 

The inhibin alpha subunit joins either the beta A or beta B subunit to form a pituitary FSH secretion inhibitor.  Inhibin has been shown to regulate gonadal stromal cell proliferation negatively and to have tumour-suppressor activity.  In addition, serum levels of inhibin have been shown to reflect the size of granulosa-cell tumors and can therefore be used as a marker for primary as well as recurrent disease.  However, in prostate cancer, expression of the inhibin alpha-subunit gene was suppressed and was not detectable in poorly differentiated tumor cells.  Furthermore, because expression in gonadal and various extragonadal tissues may vary severalfold in a tissue-specific fashion, it is proposed that inhibin may be both a growth/differentiation factor and a hormone.

See also
 Inhibin

References

Further reading